Rowe Customusic is a background music system from the 1960s and 1970s. Up to six Fidelipac type C endless-loop magnetic tape cartridges can be loaded in the player, allowing up to 60 hours of playback. The case is 13⅝" wide, 11⅛" high and 13¾" deep. Like the 3M Cantata 700, the player moves the tape head between cartridges and, as in other Fidelipac players, between the four tracks on a cartridge. The current cartridge number is indicated on a seven-segment display. Automatic track advancement was triggered by a conductive tape strip on the splice of the tape loop, or manually by pressing a button. Another switch located next to the power switch disables cartridge changeover, replaying only the current cartridge.

References

External links 
 bigdmc1: Rowe muzak player, YouTube 13 May 2010
 (German) AMI - Rowe/AMI Musikboxen und Fernwähler im Archiv von Jukebox-World – Background Music System HA 600 & HA 900 (1960), retrieved 7 December 2016
ROWE/AMI Background Music Systems 1959–1976 at the Jukebox-World
 ROWE/AMI Background Music Systems HA600, HA900, CPC-60-1, CPC-75 , CPC-10-1 from 1960 till 1976 in the Jukebox-World at Archive.is
 Pictures, ©2014 Customusic, a division of MKW Associates, Inc.

Easy listening music
Industrial music services
Tape recording